Hacılı or Hajili or Hajyly may refer to:
Hacılı, Barda, Azerbaijan
Hacılı, Jabrayil, Azerbaijan
Hacılı, Shamakhi, Azerbaijan

See also
Hacılar (disambiguation)